The following is a list of notable sports stadiums, ordered by their capacity, which refers to the maximum number of spectators they can normally accommodate.

List criteria notes
 The capacity figures are standard, permanent total capacity, including both seating and any permanent standing areas, but excluding any temporary accommodation.
 Incidental record attendance is not considered relevant. Only regular capacity counts; for attendance records, see List of sporting venues with a highest attendance of 100,000 or more.
 Only stadiums with a capacity of 40,000 or more are included in this list.
 Stadiums that are defunct or closed, or those that no longer serve as competitive sports venues (such as Great Strahov Stadium, which was the largest in the world and held around 220,000 spectators), are not included. They are listed under List of closed stadiums by capacity.
 An asterisk (*) indicates that the team plays only some (few) of its home matches at the venue, and may have another (primary) home ground.
 For purposes of this list, race tracks (such as the Indianapolis Motor Speedway and the Tokyo Racecourse) are not stadiums, and are not included here. For a list of all sports venues by capacity, see List of sports venues by capacity. 
 Capacities are taken whenever possible from the figure stated on the official website of the stadium, its tenants, or a sports event it has hosted.

List

Capacity of 100,000 or more

Capacity of 90,000–100,000

Capacity of 80,000–90,000

Capacity of 70,000–80,000

Capacity of 60,000–70,000

Capacity of 50,000–60,000

Capacity of 40,000–50,000

See also 

 List of African stadiums by capacity
 List of American football stadiums by capacity
 List of Asian stadiums by capacity
 List of association football stadiums by capacity
 List of association football stadiums by country
 List of attendance figures at domestic professional sports leagues
 List of baseball parks by capacity
 List of basketball arenas by capacity
 List of closed stadiums by capacity
 List of covered stadiums by capacity
 List of cricket grounds by capacity
 List of East Asia stadiums by capacity
 List of European stadiums by capacity
 List of GAA Stadiums by Capacity
 List of horse racing venues by capacity
 List of motor racing venues by capacity
 List of North American stadiums by capacity
 List of Oceanian stadiums by capacity
 List of rugby union stadiums by capacity
 List of South American stadiums by capacity
 List of Southeast Asia stadiums by capacity
 List of sporting venues with a highest attendance of 100,000 or more
 List of sports attendance figures
 List of sports venues by capacity
 List of tennis stadiums by capacity
 List of track and field stadiums by capacity

References 

 
Stadiums